Wang Yan (born February 11, 1974), also known as Rebecca Wang, is a Chinese actress, best known for portraying the character Qing'er in the TV series My Fair Princess II (1999) and My Fair Princess III (2003).

Filmography

Films

Television series

References

External links

 wang-yan.com (official site)
Official agency page
Sina

1974 births
Living people
20th-century Chinese actresses
21st-century Chinese actresses
Actresses from Qingdao
Chinese film actresses
Chinese television actresses
Beijing Dance Academy alumni